The following is a timeline of the history of the municipality of Rotterdam, Netherlands.

Prior to 19th century

 ca. 950 - Settlement at the lower end of the fen stream Rotte
 1270 - Dam built on Rotte.
 1299 - John I, Count of Holland granted rights to the people of Rotterdam, marking the origin of the town.
 1328 - Latin school established
 1340 - City rights granted by William IV, Count of Holland.
 1350 - Rotterdamse Schie (canal) constructed (approximate date).
 1466 - Erasmus, philosopher and Catholic theologian born.
 1477 - Saint Lawrence Church consecrated.
 1489 - Rotterdam besieged by forces of Frans van Brederode.
 1563 - Fire.
 1572 - Spanish in power.
 1574 - Admiralty of Rotterdam organized.
 1611 - Guild of Saint Luke active (approximate date).
 1622 - Erasmus statue by Hendrick de Keyser erected.
 1626 - Collegium Mechanicum established.
 1632 - Population: 20,000 (approximate).
 1643 - Scottish Presbyterian church built.
 1722 - Exchange built.
 1769 - Batavian Society for Experimental Philosophy founded.
 1773 - Studium Scientiarum Genetrix literary society formed.
 1780 - Birth of Hendrik Tollens, poet.
 1781 - Rotterdamse Academie established.
 1796 - Population: 53,212.
 1797 - Netherlands Missionary Society founded.
 1798 - Organ installed in Saint Lawrence Church.

19th century

 1813 - Johan François van Hogendorp van Heeswijk becomes mayor.
 1835 - Town Hall rebuilt.
 1838 - Population: 72,000.
 1844 - Nieuwe Rotterdamsche Courant begins publication.
 1847 - Delftsche Poort railway station opens.
 1849 - Boymans Museum opens.
 1851 - Royal Maas Yacht Club founded.
 1857 - Zoo opens.
 1859 - Rotterdamsch Leeskabinet (library) founded.
 1863 - Rotterdam Bank established.
 1866 - Population: 115,277.
 1869 - Feijenoord becomes part of city.
 1870 - Municipal waterworks established.
 1872 - Nieuwe Waterweg constructed.
 1873 - Netherlands-America Steamship Company in business.
 1874
 Katendrecht village becomes part of city.
 Oldenzeel art gallery in business.
 Fountain installed at Nieuwe Markt.
 Maritime Museum founded.
 1875
 Post office built.
  shipping firm in business.
 1876 - Rotterdamsche reinigingsdienst formed.
 1877 - Railway Bridge, Rotterdam Zuid railway station, and Rotterdam Beurs railway station open.
 1878 - Willemsbrug opens.
 1879
 Horsecar trams begin operating.
 Passage (arcade) built.
 1882 - Fish Market built.
 1885 - Museum for Geography and Ethnology opens.
 1886 - Delfshaven becomes part of city.
 1891 - Population: 203,500.
 1894 - Municipal gas and electricity established.
 1895 - Charlois and Kralingen become part of city.
 1898 - Witte Huis built.
 1900 - "Record office" established.

20th century
 1904
 Museum van Oudheden (city history museum) in operation in the Schielandshuis.
 Schiecentrale built.
 1905
 Electric trams begin operating.
 Population: 379,017.
 1908
 Rotterdam Hofplein railway station opens.
 Wilhelmina football club formed.
 1913 - Netherlands School of Commerce founded.
 1920 - Voorwaarts newspaper begins publication.
 1925 - Economic Faculty Association established.
 1927 - Natural History Museum established.
 1930
 Rotterdam Philharmonic Orchestra active.
 Naamlooze Vennootschap Margarine Unie in business.
 Rotterdams Conservatorium founded.
 1931
 Rotterdamse Dansschool founded.
 Van Nelle Factory built.
 1934
 Hoogvliet and Pernis become part of city.
 De Doelen (concert hall and convention centre) built.
 1937
 Stadion Feijenoord and Rotterdam Stadion railway station open.
 Museum of Taxation founded.
 1938
 Pieter Oud becomes mayor.
 Yevhen Konovalets is assassinated in Rotterdam by Pavel Sudoplatov.
 1940
 May 14: Rotterdam Blitz.
 Diergaarde Blijdorp (zoo) re-opens.
 1941 - Hillegersberg, IJsselmonde, Overschie, and Schiebroek become part of city.
 1945 - Pieter Oud becomes mayor again.
 1946
  adopted.
 Algemeen Dagblad begins publication.
 1953
 Rotterdam Blaak railway station and Rotterdam Noord railway station open.
 Groothandelsgebouw built.
 1956 - Airport opens.
 1957 - Rotterdam Centraal railway station opens.
 1958 - Arboretum Trompenburg opens.
 1960
 Euromast tower built.
 City hosts Floriade horticulture exhibition.
 1962 - Port of Rotterdam ranked world's busiest port by cargo tonnage.
 1964
 Rotterdam Lombardijen railway station opens.
 Hilton Hotel built.
 1965 - Regional Rinjmond Public Authority created.
 1966 - De Doelen (concert hall and convention centre) rebuilt.
 1968 - Rotterdam Metro begins operating.
 1969 - Rotterdam Alexander railway station opens.
 1970
 Poetry International first performance.
 NRC Handelsblad begins publication, after the merger between Nieuwe Rotterdamsche Courant and Algemeen Handelsblad
 Nedlloyd shipping firm in business.
 Kralingen Music Festival held.
 1972 International Film Festival Rotterdam first started.
 1973
 Charlois, Hoogvliet, and Hoek van Holland sub-municipalities created.
 Maasvlakte in operation.
 1974 - André van der Louw becomes mayor.
 1975
 Prins Alexander sub-municipality created.
 Werkcentrum Dans founded.
 1976
 IJsselmonde and Centrum Noord sub-municipalities created.
 Stoom Stichting Nederland railway museum founded.
 1977 - Sviib (student association) organized.
 1979 - HNLMS Buffel museum ship opens.
 1981
 Rotterdam Marathon begins.
 Baroeg (music venue) in business.
 1982 - Bram Peper becomes mayor.
 1984
 Zomercarnaval begins.
 Cube houses built near Oude Haven.
 1986 - Port of Rotterdam ranked world's busiest container port.
 1988 - Hogeschool Rotterdam established.
 1990 - Witte de With Center for Contemporary Art and Shipping and Transport College established.
 1991 - Gebouw Delftse Poort built.
 1992 - Kunsthal art museum opens.
 1993
 Netherlands Architecture Institute relocates to Rotterdam.
 Chabot Museum opens.
 1994 - V2 Institute for the Unstable Media active.
 1996
 Erasmus Bridge opens.
 Schouwburgplein (square) redesigned.
 1997 - MAMA project established by Public Art Squad Foundation.
 1999
 Ivo Opstelten becomes mayor.
 WORM (Rotterdam) active.
 2000
 Architecture Film Festival Rotterdam begins.
 Codarts University for the Arts opens.
 KPN Tower built.

21st century

 2001
 World Port Center built.
 Oceanium (aquarium) opens.
 City designated a European Capital of Culture.
 2002 - Regio Randstad regional governance group formed.
 2003 - Netherlands Photo Museum opens.
 2005 - Montevideo (residential skyscraper) built.
 2006
 North Sea Jazz Festival begins in Rotterdam.
 Rotterdam Circus Arts founded.
 2007 - RandstadRail and Betuweroute in operation.
 2009
 Ahmed Aboutaleb becomes first Muslim mayor of a major European city.
 Maastoren skyscraper built.
 2010
 Rozenburg becomes part of city.
 Pernis sub-municipality created.
 New Orleans (residential skyscraper) built.
 2010 Tour de France cycling race starts from Rotterdam.
 2012 - Population: 616,250.
 2013 Maasvlakte 2 in operation.
 2014 
 Market Hall built.
 Rotterdam Centraal station in operation.
 2020 - Population: 651,376
 2021
 Depot Museum Boijmans Van Beuningen.
 De Zalmhaven built.
 Floating Office Rotterdam (FOR) built, accommodating the Global Center on Adaptation.

See also
 
 List of mayors of Rotterdam
 
 
 Timelines of other municipalities in the Netherlands: Amsterdam, Breda, Delft, Eindhoven, Groningen, Haarlem, The Hague, 's-Hertogenbosch, Leiden, Maastricht, Nijmegen, Utrecht

References

Bibliography

In English
 
 
 
 
 
 
 

In Dutch

External links
 
  (map that includes Rotterdam)
 Europeana. Items related to Rotterdam, various dates.
 Digital Public Library of America. Items related to Rotterdam, various dates

 
Rotterdam
Years in the Netherlands